Rousměrov is a municipality and village in Žďár nad Sázavou District in the Vysočina Region of the Czech Republic. It has about 100 inhabitants.

Administrative parts
The village of Laštovičky is an administrative part of Rousměrov.

References

Villages in Žďár nad Sázavou District